The Columbia Mountains are a group of mountain ranges along the Upper Columbia River in British Columbia, Montana, Idaho and Washington. The mountain range covers 135,952 km² (52,491 sq mi). The range is bounded by the Rocky Mountain Trench on the east, and the Kootenai River on the south; their western boundary is the edge of the Interior Plateau. Seventy-five percent of the range is located in Canada and the remaining twenty-five percent in the United States; American geographic classifications place the Columbia Mountains as part of the Rocky Mountains complex, but this designation does not apply in Canada (despite a British Columbia government tourism campaign to rebrand their southern portion as the "Kootenay Rockies").  Mount Sir Sandford is the highest mountain in the range, reaching .

Mountain ranges
The Columbia Mountains are made up of four large ranges containing many subranges:

 Cariboo Mountains
 Lunn Icefield
 Mowdish Range
 Premier Range
 Vimy Ridge
 Wavy Range
 Monashee Mountains
 Anstey Range
 Christina Range
 Gold Range
 Jordan Range
 Kettle River Range
 Malton Range
 Midway Range
 Ratchford Range
 Rossland Range
 Scrip Range
 Whatshan Range
 The Pinnacles
 Selkirk Mountains
 Asulkan Range
 Battle Range
 Big Bend Ranges
 Adamant Range
 Sir Sandford Range
 Windy Range
 Bishops Range
 Bonnington Range
 Clachnacudainn Range
 Dawson Range
 Duncan Ranges
 Badshot Range
 Goat Range
 Hermit Range
 Kokanee Range
 Slocan Ranges
 Lardeau Range
 Nelson Range
 Purity Range
 Sir Donald Range
 Valhalla Ranges
 Ruby Range
 Valkyr Range
 Norns Range
 Purcell Mountains (Percell Mountains in the United States)
 The Bugaboos Group
 Carbonate Range
 Dogtooth Range
 Farnham Group
 MacBeth Group
 McGillivary Range
 Moyie Range
 Septet Range
 Spillimacheen Range
 Starbird Ridge
 Commander Group
 Stockdale Group
 Toby Glacier
 Truce Group
 Yahk Range

Additionally lower areas to the west of the main ranges are sometimes included in the description of the Cariboo Mountains:
 Quesnel Highland
 Gosse Range
 Palmer Range
 Goose Range
 Palmer Range
 Shuswap Highland
 Hunters Range
 Mabel Range
 Park Range
 Sawtooth Range
 Seymour Range
 Shuswap Range
 Silver Hills
 Trinity Hills
 Okanagan Highland
 Beaverdell Range

Some classification systems end the Columbia Mountains at the North Thompson River, such that the Cariboo Mountains are assigned to the Interior Plateau.  Where the Columbia Mountains meet the Interior Plateau there are intermediary areas known as highlands - the Quesnel Highland (west flank of the Cariboos), the Shuswap Highland (south of the Cariboos and west of the northern Monashees), and the Okanagan Highland (west of the southern Monashees).  These are listed here but are often considered to be part of the Interior Plateau.

Some geographic classifications also include the Cabinet Mountains and Salish Mountains, which lie south of the Purcells between the Kootenai River and the Clark Fork of the Columbia, but in US classification systems they are generally considered to be part of the Rocky Mountains.

Physiographically, they are a distinct province of the larger Rocky Mountain System physiographic division.

Highest Mountains
The following mountains are the 10 highest mountains (in order) contained within the Columbian Mountains:

 Mount Sir Sandford (3,519 m) (Selkirks)
 Mount Sir Wilfrid Laurier (3,516 m) (Cariboos)
 Mount Farnham (3,493 m) (Purcells)
 Jumbo Mountain (3,437 m) (Purcells)
 Howser Spire (3,412 m) (Purcells)
 Mount Delphine (3,406 m) (Purcells)
 Mount Sir John Abbott (3,398 m) (Cariboos)
 Mount Hammond (3,387 m) (Purcells)
 Mount Dawson (3,377 m) (Selkirks)
 Eyebrow Peak (3,362 m) (Purcells)

Passes

The following passes are located within or on the perimeter of the Columbia Mountains:

 Cedarside Pass (Fraser and Columbia Rivers 800m)
 Canal Flats (Columbia and Kootenay Rivers)
 Rogers Pass (between Revelstoke and Golden)
 Kootenay Pass (between Trail and Creston)
 Eagle Pass (between Revelstoke and Sicamous)
 Monashee Pass (BC Hwy 6)
 Bonanza Pass (Christina Lake to Castlegar/Rossland)

National and provincial parks

 Ansty Hunakwa Protected Area
 Bowron Lake Provincial Park
 Bugaboo Provincial Park
 Cariboo Mountains Provincial Park
 Dunn Peak Protected Area
 Glacier National Park
 Gladstone Provincial Park
 Goat Range Provincial Park
 Granby Provincial Park
 Graystokes Provincial Park
 Kianuko Provincial Park
 Kokanee Glacier Provincial Park
 Monashee Provincial Park
 Mount Revelstoke National Park
 Myra-Bellevue Provincial Park
 Okanagan Mountain Provincial Park
 Purcell Wilderness Conservancy Provincial Park and Protected Area
 St. Mary's Alpine Provincial Park
 Silver Star Provincial Park
 Valhalla Provincial Park
 Wells Gray Provincial Park
 West Arm Provincial Park
 West Twin Provincial Park and Protected Area

See also

References

Sources

 
 
 Columbia Mountains on Canadian Mountain Encyclopedia

 
Physiographic provinces
Lists of mountain ranges of Canada
Mountain ranges of British Columbia
Mountain ranges of Idaho
Mountain ranges of Montana
Mountain ranges of Washington (state)